The 2012 CSIO Gijón was the 2012 edition of the Spanish official show jumping horse show, at Las Mestas Sports Complex in Gijón. It was held as CSIO 5*.

This edition of the CSIO Gijón was held between August 29 and September 3.

Nations Cup
The 2012 FEI Nations Cup of Spain was the fifth competition of the 2012 FEI Nations Cup Promotional League and was held on Saturday, September 1, 2012.

The competition was a show jumping competition with two rounds. The height of the fences were up to 1.60 meters. The best six teams of the eleven which participated were allowed to start in the second round. As participant in the Promotional League, Denmark was also allowed to participate in the second round.

The competition was endowed with €64,000.

Grey penalties points do not count for the team result.

Gijón Grand Prix
The Gijón Grand Prix, the Show jumping Grand Prix of the 2012 CSIO Gijón, was the major show jumping competition at this event. It was held on Monday 2 August 2013. The competition was a show jumping competition over two rounds, the height of the fences were up to 1.60 meters.

It was endowed with 125,000 €.

(Top 10 of 45 Competitors)

References

External links
Official website
All results of CSIO Gijón 2012

CSIO Gijón
2012 in show jumping
2012 FEI Nations Cup